Nirbhay (meaning Dauntless/Fearless) is a long range, all-weather, subsonic cruise missile designed and developed in India by the Aeronautical Development Establishment (ADE) which is under Defence Research and Development Organisation (DRDO). The missile can be launched from multiple platforms and is capable of carrying conventional and nuclear warheads. It is currently deployed in limited numbers in Line of Actual Control (LAC) during standoff with China.

Design

Nirbhay is powered by a solid rocket booster for take off which is developed by Advanced Systems Laboratory (ASL). Upon reaching the required velocity and height, a turbofan engine in the missile takes over for further propulsion. The missile is guided by an inertial navigation system developed by Research Centre Imarat (RCI) and a radio altimeter for the height determination. The missile has a ring laser gyroscope (RLG) based guidance, control and navigation system. It also has a microelectromechanical system (MEMS) based inertial navigation system (INS) along with the GPS/NavIC system. The missile has a length of 6 metres, width of 0.52 metres, a wing span of 2.7 metres and weighs about 1500 kg. It has a range of about 1500 km and is capable of delivering 24 different types of warheads depending on mission requirements between 200 and 300 kg.

The missile is claimed to have sea-skimming and loitering capability, i.e., it can go round a target and perform several manoeuvres and then re-engage it. It is also able to pick out a target and attack it among multiple targets. With two side wings, the missile is capable of flying at different altitudes ranging from 50 m to 4 km above the ground and can also fly at low altitudes (like low tree level) to avoid detection by enemy radar. It will eventually supplement the role played by BrahMos missile for the Indian Armed Forces by delivering warheads farther than the 450 km range.

Development and trials
After the design was finalized, the technology required for the missile was developed. It was integrated by Research and Development Establishment (Engineers), a specialized arm of DRDO. Tata Motors has built the vehicle that is the carrier/launcher for the Nirbhay system and is based on a "high mobility, all-terrain and all-wheel drive Tata LPTA 5252-12 X 12 vehicle", developed in partnership with DRDO.

The first test flight of the missile was planned in October 2012, but the launch was postponed to December owing to the changes being made to the launcher. V. K. Saraswat, Director General & Scientific Adviser of DRDO, later said that the missile would be tested in February 2013. He said the delay was due to development of some processes. DRDO expected the missile to be ready for induction within 12 to 18 months after the February test. There were unconfirmed media reports that the missile would be scrapped due to multiple test failures but it was then reported that the project has been given an 18-month extension, till June 2018, to fix all outstanding issues. Nirbhay cruise missile has a single shot kill ratio of above 90 percent.

First trial 
The surface version of Nirbhay missile was test fired for the first time on 12 March 2013 from the Integrated Test Range (ITR) at Chandipur in Balasore district of Odisha. The missile in its maiden flight was supposed to hit a static target situated 1500 km away in the Bay of Bengal. Missile took off from the launch pad successfully and reached the second stage of propulsion, traveling 15 minutes through its envisaged path at a speed of 0.7 mach. After that it veered away from its trajectory forcing the command center to detach the engine from the missile midway into the flight. This was done to avoid the risk of the missile hitting the coastal areas. The missile was purposely destroyed in mid-flight.

The test was a partial success as the missile took off, reached the second stage of propulsion, and traveled 30% of its range and completed most of the mission objectives, before deviating from its path. DRDO has detected the problem which was a faulty inertial navigation system and corrected the same in subsequent tests.

Second trial
A second launch of the Nirbhay missile was scheduled for February–May 2014 but it was further delayed until October 2014. Slight delay in October was also due to cyclone Hudhud. On 17 October 2014, the surface version of the missile was tested once again from the Integrated Test Range at Chandipur in Balasore district of Odisha, and this time the test was successful. The missile test met all the parameters & completed all 15 way-points. The missile traveled for more than 1500 km that lasted for a duration of over 1 hour and 10 minutes. The missile was tracked with the help of ground-based radars and its health parameters were monitored by telemetry stations from DRDO's ITR and LRDE (Electronics & Radar Development Establishment). An Indian Air Force SEPECAT Jaguar chased the missile during its flight to capture the video of the flight.

Third trial
The third test of the missile took place on 16 October 2015. The missile was to be tested for its low flying capability. The missile in flight was supposed to be brought down from 4800 meters to 20 meters gradually and in stages. A Su-30MKI aircraft videotaped the flight. A press release by the Ministry of Defence stated the missile was launched at 11:38 IST and all initial critical operations such as Booster ignition, Booster separation, Wing deployment and engine start were successfully executed and Nirbhay reached the desired Cruise Altitude. Although the take off was successful after repeated disruptions of countdown, the missile crashed into the Bay of Bengal 11 minutes into its flight after covering only 128 km of its 1500 km range.

Fourth trial 

The fourth test of the missile took place on 21 December 2016 from Launch Complex-III of Integrated Test Range (ITR) at Balasore in Odisha around 11:56 IST. There has been no official word on the test outcome, however according to news reports this test was not successful. The booster engine in the first stage started working and lifted the missile off from its launcher. But the missile started veering dangerously towards one side in two minutes after lift-off and veered outside its safety corridor. Due to this, the test was aborted and the missile was remotely destroyed. A potential reason for the failure was described as a hardware problem with one of the missile's component.

Fifth trial 
The fifth successful test of the missile took place on 7 November 2017 from Launch Complex-III of Integrated Test Range (ITR) at Balasore in Odisha around 11:20 IST. The flight test was a success and met all mission objectives. During the test, the missile traveled a distance of 647 km over a 50 minute duration, and was tracked by ground based radars and telemetry stations. This trial of the missile used a turbojet engine instead of a turbofan engine

Sixth trial 

The sixth successful trial took place on April 15, 2019. Traversing around 650 km, the test missile navigated way-points located at altitudes varying from 5 meters to 2.5 km. DRDO clarified that all mission objectives were met. The test also validated the terrain hugging and the sea skimming capability of the missile.

This trial completed the developmental trials of the missile. The next set of trials will be conducted as per the requirements of the Indian Armed Forces.

Nirbhay project is now technically closed after completing six developmental trials. The next phase of tests will happen from April 2020 under a new name called Indigenous Technology Cruise Missile (ITCM). It will include Small Turbo Fan Engine (STFE) developed by Gas Turbine Research Establishment (GTRE) and a radio-frequency (RF) seeker from Research Centre Imarat (RCI). A separate air-launched variant and submarine-launched variant is under active development.

Seventh trial 
On 24 June 2021, Nirbhay was successfully test-fired from Launch Pad No. 3 of the Integrated Test Range at Chandipur. The successful test was conducted with the GTRE Manik engine paving the way for a full range test.

Variants

Base variant 
The standard Nirbhay subsonic cruise missile is powered by a Russian NPO Saturn 36MT engine.

Indigenous Technology Cruise Missile (ITCM) 
Indigenous Technology Cruise Missile (ITCM) is based on Nirbhay missile but uses locally developed Small Turbo Fan Engine (STFE), also known as Manik Engine from Gas Turbine Research Establishment.

First trial 
On 12 October 2020, the missile was test fired for the first time with indigenously developed GTRE STFE MANIK turbofan engine. The test was aborted after 8 minutes of launch. As per DRDO, the missile deviated from predetermined flight path and was destroyed mid-air by mission control team.

Second trial 
On 11 August 2021, ITCM was test fired from Integrated Test Range (ITR). But it was a partial success. As per DRDO officials, MANIK engine performed well but the missile failed to achieve the desired range due to failure in control mechanism.

Third trial 
On 28 October 2022, ITCM test fired from ITR failed due to a snag in the engine after separation of booster stage. This test included an upgraded radio frequency seeker.

Fourth trial 
On 21 February 2023, ITCM was test fired successfully. Fitted with an upgraded radio frequency seeker and Manik engine.

See also

Kh-55 - Russia
3M14 -Russia
BGM-109 Tomahawk - United States
Hyunmoo-3 - South Korea
CJ-10 - China
HN-1/2/3 - China
Qader - Iran
Atmaca - Turkey
SOM - Turkey
Noor ASCM - Iran
Zafar - Iran
Babur - Pakistan
YJ-83 - China
YJ-62 - China
Otomat - Italy
MdCN - UK, France, Italy
List of missiles by country
India and weapons of mass destruction

References

External links

 CSIS Missile Threat - Nirbhay
 Nirbhay integration into Su-30MKI
 Liquid fuel Ramjet technology
 India to launch sub-sonic missile next month

Technical:
 Engine Layout and Modules of MANIK STFE
 DRDO Technology Focus : Warhead for Missiles, Torpedoes and Rockets

Cruise missiles of India
Military equipment introduced in the 2020s